Rose–Hulman Institute of Technology (RHIT) is a private university in Terre Haute, Indiana. Founded in 1874 in Terre Haute, Rose-Hulman is one of the United States' few undergraduate-focused engineering and technology universities. Though it started with only 3 bachelor's degree programs, Rose-Hulman has since grown to 12 academic departments with over 30 undergraduate and graduate degree programs in science, engineering, technology, and engineering management, leading to bachelor's and master's degrees. Rose-Hulman's curriculum focuses on both career preparation and undergraduate-driven research in STEM-fields. It is classified among "Special Focus Four-Year: Engineering and Other Technology-Related Schools".

History

Founding

Founder Chauncey Rose, along with nine friends, created the Terre Haute School of Industrial Science in 1874 to provide technical training after encountering difficulties in local engineer availability during construction of his railroads. Mr. Rose donated the land at 13th and Locust St. and the majority of the funds needed to start the new school. A year later, the cornerstone of the new institution was laid and the name was changed to Rose Polytechnic Institute despite the objections of the president of the board of managers and chief benefactor, Mr. Rose. The original campus was a single building, with no dormitories or recreational facilities.

The first class of 48 students entered in 1883, chosen from 58 applicants. Of the 48 students, all were male, and 37 came from Indiana. All but four students chose to major in mechanical engineering with civil engineering and chemistry the only other majors. Nearly half of the original students would eventually quit their studies before graduation for several reasons, including poor grades or conduct. The first president was Charles O. Thompson, who modeled the education of Rose Poly after eastern institutions. Rose Poly was thus founded as the first private engineering college west of the Alleghenies.

During the beginning years of the school, money was a major concern. Many faculty and staff accepted pay cuts to stay at the institution.

In 1889 the school awarded what it considers to be the first chemical engineering degree in the country. In 1897 John B. Peddle was appointed professor of machine design, where he served until 1933. In 1910 he published the Construction of Graphical Charts, which was the first book in the English language treating the art of graphical representation.

Relocation
The old location was used continually by the Vigo County School District from 1922 to 2013; as of 2020 the Terre Haute Boys & Girls Club occupies the site. The cornerstone of the new campus was laid in 1922. The new campus consisted of an academic building (now known as Moench Hall) and the institute's first dorm, Deming Hall, both of which are still in use today.

Early life at Rose consisted of social fraternities, athletics, and the occasional "high jinks". A popular "high jinks" involved the sophomore class inviting the freshmen class to a baseball game but were told to "leave their pipes with the nurse". The freshmen would produce the pipes at a specific time and a brawl would ensue.

War years
During World War I, Rose Poly trained students in technical subjects like vehicle maintenance and created an ROTC Engineer unit which later became the Wabash Battalion Army ROTC program. During World War II the ROTC unit was replaced with an Army Specialized Training Unit and students could enter and graduate after every quarter to support the war effort. This enrollment schedule continued through the post-war years until 1951.

1960s–1970s
In recognition of the Hulman family's significant contributions and continued financial support, in particular a $15 million addition to the endowment, Rose Polytechnic was renamed Rose–Hulman Institute of Technology in 1971.

During the 1960s and 1970s, growth accelerated under president John A. Logan. Five new residence halls, a new student union, library, and a student recreation center were all constructed between 1963 and 1976. Permission was sought and received to increase the student population to 1000.

The quarterly cryptology journal Cryptologia was founded and published at RHIT from 1977 to 1995, at which time it was moved to the United States Military Academy.

1990s-present
For most of its history, Rose-Hulman was a men's only institution with some cooperative arrangements with Saint Mary Of-The-Woods College women's school and Indiana State University. It voted to become coeducational in 1991, with the first full-time women students starting in 1995. In 1984, recognizing the importance of the personal computer, Rose-Hulman started making the Zenith Z-150 desktop computer available to the students at a reduced cost, but they were not required to have it. In 1995, the college required all incoming freshmen to purchase a laptop computer designated by the school, becoming one of the first schools to do so.

In the decade following 1995, Rose-Hulman's growth was aided by a major fundraising campaign, "Vision to be the Best". Originally a $100 million campaign over ten years, it met its goal in half the time. The goal was extended to $200 million, and by the end of the campaign in June 2004, over $250 million had been raised. In 1997, many physical changes came to the Rose-Hulman campus. Due to a gift from the F. W. Olin Foundation, an expansion of Olin Hall known as the Olin Advanced Learning Center opened. Additionally, The John T Myers Center for Technological Research opened, with space for research labs, presentation rooms, classrooms, and academic offices. Shook Field House was replaced with the $20 million Sports and Recreation Center, which the National Football League's Indianapolis Colts used for their summer training camp from 1999 to 2010. In 2002, Hatfield Hall, a theater and alumni center, was opened.

After the 2004 retirement of institute president Samuel Hulbert, who had led the school since 1976, the college faced a leadership crisis. Soon after John J. Midgley arrived as the new president, rumors of conflict between Midgley and the administration started to circulate. Students, some wearing T-shirts proclaiming "Hit the Road Jack," held a rally calling for Midgley's resignation. Midgley resigned as president of the institute on June 11, 2005, less than a year into his presidency, after the faculty, staff, and Student Government Association approved votes of no confidence. During the succeeding academic year, Robert Bright, the chairman of the Board of Trustees, served as interim chief executive officer.

In 2006, Gerald Jakubowski, Vice President and Professor of Engineering at Arizona State University, became the 13th president of the institute, taking over July 1, 2006. In 2009, Jakubowski resigned.

In 2009, the Board of Trustees elected Matt Branam to serve as interim president. He became president later that year. Branam died of a heart attack in April 2012. The cabinet subsequently selected Robert A. Coons as the institute's Interim President.

In 2013, the Board of Trustees named James C. Conwell as the institute's 15th president, starting May 1, 2013.

In 2017, the school acquired  from the former home of Mari Hulman George.

In 2018, Conwell resigned as president and Senior Vice President Robert Coons was appointed to serve as acting president, and now serves as the current university president. Additionally, the Hulman Memorial Student Union was renovated and renamed the Mussallem Union after the primary donors, the Mussallem Family. The Mussallem Union is centrally located on campus and provides student meeting spaces, dining areas, conference rooms, health services, bookstore, and administrative space.

In 2019, an expansion of the Branam Innovation Center (BIC), the Kremer Innovation Center (KIC) opened. The BIC and KIC provide rapid prototyping and manufacturing options to students, in addition to housing thermofluids and wet lab facilities, conference rooms, classrooms, and project team workshops.

In 2021, the New Academic Building was opened, with funding provided by a $15 million lead gift by an anonymous donor. The New Academic Building is home to the Engineering Design program, Chemistry Lab facilities, food science laboratory, breakout and study rooms, as well as a large atrium. Together with Moench Hall and the Myers Center, a new courtyard was opened. The New Academic building is the first building in the state of Indiana to apply for WELL recognition.

Academics
The curricula at RHIT concentrate on engineering and the natural sciences. The school's primary focus is undergraduate education, though there is a small graduate program for master's degree students. There are no doctoral programs. As of 2021, Rose-Hulman has 189 faculty members, 99% of whom held a PhD. The current student-to-faculty ratio is 10:1. Admission to the institute remains competitive due to its self-selecting admissions class and applicant sharing with Purdue, and other top universities. In 2020, 547 freshman students enrolled out of 4,376 applicants. The school operates on three academic quarters plus an optional summer session.

Rose-Hulman is a member of the College Consortium of Western Indiana. This membership allows students who are full-time at their home institution to take classes at the other member institutions of Indiana State University and Saint Mary-of-the-Woods College.

Accreditation
Rose-Hulman has been regionally accredited by the Higher Learning Commission since 1916, with the most recent reaffirmation of accreditation having occurred in the 2014-2015 accreditation year. 
The Biomedical Engineering, Chemical Engineering, Civil Engineering, Computer Engineering, Computer Science, Electrical Engineering, Engineering Physics, Mechanical Engineering, Optical Engineering, and Software Engineering programs are accredited by The Accreditation Board for Engineering and Technology (ABET).

In addition to institutional membership in the American Society for Engineering Education, the institute is also a member of the Association of Independent Technological Universities, a group formed to further the interests of private engineering schools.

Rankings and reputation
As of 2021, the institute has been ranked #1 among engineering colleges that do not offer a doctorate degree by U.S. News & World Report for 24 consecutive years. Each individual program assessed has also been ranked first since the magazine has published individual rankings. These programs are the Chemical, Civil, Computer, Electrical, Mechanical, and Biomedical Engineering programs (Biomedical Engineering programs have only received assessment in the 2015 rankings).

Student life
The student body tends to come mostly from the Midwest United States, though as the school has gained prominence it has gradually attracted a more geographically and ethnically diverse applicant pool. 39% of students hail from the state of Indiana with large numbers of students from the nearby states of Illinois, Ohio, Michigan and Minnesota.

The school has several competition teams that operate out of the Branam Innovation Center. They compete in collegiate series such as Formula SAE, Shell Eco-Marathon, Human Powered Vehicle Challenge, Rose Rocketry, AIAA Design/Build/Fly, Chem-E-Car and various robotics competitions among many others.

There are eight social fraternities and three social sororities, some of which have their houses on campus. The fraternities are: Alpha Tau Omega, Delta Sigma Phi, Lambda Chi Alpha, Phi Gamma Delta, Pi Kappa Alpha, Sigma Nu, Theta Xi, and Triangle. The sororities are Delta Delta Delta, Chi Omega, and Alpha Omicron Pi. As of 2003, nearly 69% of the students were members of Greek social organizations. There are also three gender-inclusive professional fraternities: Alpha Chi Sigma, Alpha Phi Omega, and Kappa Theta Pi.

The Homework Hotline provides free homework help and tutoring to Indiana middle school and high school students. The program started in 1991 and is funded by the Lilly Endowment, Inc. and Rose–Hulman Institute of Technology.

Rose-Hulman Ventures serves as a source of internships and job opportunities with startups and established companies of all sizes for Rose students and alumni. Rose-Hulman Ventures was established in 1999 with a $30 million grant from the Lilly Endowment and received a $24.9 million follow-up grant in 2002.

Athletics

The team's sports teams are called the Rose–Hulman Fightin' Engineers.

Media
The school is served by an independently funded, student-run newspaper, The Rose Thorn, that focuses on campus news.

Rose-Hulman has an amateur radio club, the Rose Tech Radio Club (call sign W9NAA), that maintains a dedicated on-campus station.

The Rose-Hulman Film Club produces student-directed short films.

The campus radio station was WMHD-FM 90.7 FM, "The Monkey". The station originally broadcast with a very low power transmitter and antenna located on campus, but later operated with an off-site transmitter at 1400 watts. The studio facilities for the station were in the basement of the BSB residence hall. The station was operated entirely by student volunteers, and all disc-jockeys choose their own format and playlists. In August 2014, the station was sold to Indiana State University.

Noted alumni

 Tim Cindric 1990 (Mechanical Engineering), president of Penske Racing 
Barzilla W. Clark, 16th Governor of Idaho
 Ernest R. Davidson 1958, National Medal of Science winner
 Lawrence Giacoletto 1938, Transistor pioneer
 Marshall Goldsmith 1970, Noted Management consultant
 John Hostettler 1983, Former U.S. Congressman from Indiana
 Curtis Huttenhower 2000, professor at Harvard T.H. Chan School of Public Health
 Don Lincoln 1986, Particle Physicist
 Chris Mack 1982, Noted Lithography expert
 Art Nehf 1914, Major League Baseball pitcher
 Abe Silverstein 1929, Aeronautical engineer, NASA center director, and Guggenheim Medal winner
 Mike Thomas 2000, co founder of Monomi Park, software engineer for Slime Rancher
 Mat Roy Thompson 1890–1891, Civil Engineer and builder of Scotty's Castle
 Jim Umpleby 1980, Caterpillar, Inc. CEO as of January 2017
 Bernard Vonderschmitt 1944, co-founder of Xilinx
 Robert L. Wilkins 1986, Judge, United States District Court for the District of Columbia

See also 

 Association of Independent Technological Universities

References

Further reading

External links
 

 
Private universities and colleges in Indiana
Educational institutions established in 1874
Education in Terre Haute, Indiana
Buildings and structures in Terre Haute, Indiana
Tourist attractions in Terre Haute, Indiana
Engineering universities and colleges in Indiana
1874 establishments in Indiana
Universities and colleges accredited by the Higher Learning Commission